The 2022–23 Minnesota Golden Gophers women's ice hockey season represent the University of Minnesota during the 2022–23 NCAA Division I women's ice hockey season.

Offseason

Recruiting

Regular season

Standings

Schedule 

Source .

|-
!colspan=12 style=";" | Regular Season

|-
!colspan=12 style=";" | 

|-
!colspan=12 style=";" |

Roster 
Source:

Awards and honors

 On October 17, 2022, Grace Zumwinkle was named WCHA Forward of the Week for the eighth time.
 On October 17, 2022, Skylar Vetter was honored with her second WCHA Goaltender of the Week.
 On October 31, 2022, Taylor Heise was named WCHA Forward of the Week.
 On October 31, 2022, Skylar Vetter was honored with her third WCHA Goaltender of the Week.
 On November 1, 2022, Skylar Vetter was named the WCHA Goaltender of the Month for October.
 On November 1, 2022, Abbey Murphy was awarded with her first-ever WCHA Forward of the Month.
 On December 12, 2022, Taylor Heise was again named WCHA Forward of the Week.
 On December 12, 2022, Skylar Vetter was named WCHA Goaltender of the Week.
 On January 3, 2023, Skylar Vetter was awarded her second WCHA Goaltender of the Month this season for posting 3 shutouts and only 1 goal against during December.
 On January 4, 2023, Taylor Heise was named National Player of the Month by the Hockey Commissioners Association for December.
 On January 4, 2023, Skylar Vetter was acknowledged as the National Goaltender of the Month for her impersonation of a brick wall during December 2022.
 On January 9, 2023, Grace Zumwinkle was named WCHA Forward of the Week.
 On January 23, 2023, Taylor Heise was again acknowledged as the WCHA Forward of the Week.
 On January 23, 2023, Madison Kaiser was awarded with her first WCHA Rookie of the Week.

References 

Women's ice hockey
Minnesota
Minnesota Golden Gophers women's ice hockey
Minnesota Golden Gophers women's ice hockey
Minnesota Golden Gophers women's ice hockey seasons
NCAA women's ice hockey Frozen Four seasons